The A.I. Marinesko Museum of the History of Russian Submarine Forces is a state museum located in Saint-Petersburg, Russia. The museum was named in honor of the Soviet submarine commander Alexander Marinesko. The museum was established in 1997.

The museum contains many items relevant to the Russian submarine forces, including: models of submarines, personal items, documents and photos of sailors, original equipment from Soviet submarines, items associated with Russian naval traditions, and maps of naval battles.

External links
 музеймаринеско.рф // Official site 

Maritime museums in Saint Petersburg
Military and war museums in Saint Petersburg
Submarine museums